Lydia Mak Ho Yi (born 29 April 1999) is a Hongkonger footballer who plays as a defender for Hong Kong Women League club Tai Po FC and the Hong Kong women's national team.

International career
Mak represented Hong Kong at the 2017 AFC U-19 Women's Championship qualification, the 2018 Asian Games, the 2019 EAFF E-1 Football Championship and the 2020 AFC Women's Olympic Qualifying Tournament.

See also
List of Hong Kong women's international footballers

References

1999 births
Living people
People from Kowloon
Hong Kong women's footballers
Women's association football defenders
Hong Kong women's international footballers